Nebria sajanica is a species of ground beetle in the Nebriinae subfamily that can be found in Buryat Republic and Eastern Sayans. The name comes from the Sayan region where it lives. The species is common in Eastern Siberia and Tunkinsky District of Turan.

References

sajanica
Beetles described in 1932
Endemic fauna of Russia